The 1978 New Zealand bravery awards were announced via four Special Honours Lists dated 20 April, 18 May, 13 July, and 2 November 1978, and recognised six people for acts of bravery in 1977 or 1978.

Queen's Gallantry Medal (QGM)
 Inspector Melroy Kenneth Huggard – New Zealand Police.

Queen's Commendation for Brave Conduct
 Sapper Laurence Gerald Salmon – 1st Field Squadron, Royal New Zealand Engineers.

 Sergeant John Halladay Smith – Royal Regiment of New Zealand Artillery, 4th (G) Medium Battery; of Ngāruawāhia.

 Peter Crichton – first officer, Christchurch Prison (Addington), Department of Justice.

 Constable Kerry James Borrows – New Zealand Police.
 Constable Gerard Prins – New Zealand Police.

References

Bravery
Bravery awards
New Zealand bravery awards